Scratchbury & Cotley Hills SSSI is a 53.5 hectare biological Site of Special Scientific Interest at Norton Bavant in Wiltshire, England, notified in 1951. The Iron Age hillfort of Scratchbury Camp occupies the summit of the hill.

Sources

 English Nature citation sheet for the site (accessed 6 August 2006)

External links
 English Nature website (SSSI information)

Sites of Special Scientific Interest in Wiltshire
Sites of Special Scientific Interest notified in 1951
Hills of Wiltshire